"Bobby Sox to Stockings" is a song written by Russell Faith, Clarence Kehner and Richard DiCicco and performed by Frankie Avalon. The song reached #8 on the Billboard Top 100 an #26 on the R&B chart in 1959.

The song was arranged by Peter De Angelis.

The song was ranked #70 on Billboard magazine's Top Hot 100 songs of 1959.

References

1959 songs
1959 singles
Frankie Avalon songs
Chancellor Records singles